Semaeopus argocosma is a moth of the family Geometridae first described by Louis Beethoven Prout in 1935. It is found on Jamaica.

References

Moths described in 1935
Cosymbiini